Sageretia lucida is a shrub and can be found with or without spines.  It is found in sparse forests within valleys about 300 to 800 m in elevation. Its native distribution is south-central China, southeast China including Hainan, Nepal, Sri Lanka and Vietnam.

References

RHAMNACEAE

lucida
Flora of South-Central China
Flora of Southeast China
Flora of Hainan
Flora of Nepal
Flora of Sri Lanka
Flora of Vietnam
Taxa named by Elmer Drew Merrill